Dumb and Dumberer: When Harry Met Lloyd is a 2003 American buddy comedy film directed by Troy Miller from a screenplay by Miller and Robert Brener. It is the second installment in the Dumb and Dumber franchise and a prequel to the 1994 film Dumb and Dumber. Depicting the original film's characters during their high school years, it stars Derek Richardson and Eric Christian Olsen in the title roles. The film was a moderate box office success, but negatively received by critics, who compared it unfavourably with the original.

Plot
In 1986, Harry Dunne finally gets his chance to go to regular school. At the same time, Lloyd Christmas has been adopted and exchanged several times until he is finally accepted by the school janitor, Ray. Harry bumps into Lloyd on the way to school, in search of a treasure his mother asked him to find, and as if it were destiny, the two instantly became the best of friends. Lloyd introduces Harry to his "friend", Turk, the school bully whose main function in life appears to be making Lloyd's life miserable. After putting Lloyd in a trash can, he hoists the two friends up a flagpole.

Meanwhile, the corrupt Principal Collins is searching for a way to get a large amount of money to get a condominium in Waikiki, Hawaii for him and his girlfriend, Ms. Heller, the school's cafeteria lady. Seeing Harry and Lloyd getting hoisted on a flagpole, Principal Collins decides to establish a fake "special needs" class to swindle $100,000 from a former Special Needs student named Richard Moffit. Obviously, Harry and Lloyd are more than thrilled to help, unaware of the real reason, and thus find themselves signing up people who are "special" enough for the class. These include a reluctant Turk; a teen named Toby who broke his leg and arm in a skateboarding accident—and whom Lloyd believes is a "little crippled boy"; Toby's gorgeous girlfriend, Terri; geeky Lewis, whom Harry and Lloyd believe is a centaur after seeing him half-dressed in his horse mascot uniform; Cindy, also known as "Ching-Chong", a Chinese exchange student who later becomes Turk's girlfriend; and Carl, a badly injured football player obsessed with his sport. Ms. Heller becomes the teacher of the fake class and holds it in Ray's tool shed.

Jessica Matthews, a headstrong student and reporter for the school paper, is suspicious of Principal Collins' sudden contribution. Jessica invites Harry over to her house for dinner and asks Harry for information. Harry, who thinks that she is flirting with him, turns to Lloyd for courtship tips. A repulsive disaster involving Jessica's bathroom and a melted chocolate bar that looks like feces makes her father freak out, inadvertently directing her attention to Lloyd. Soon, Harry and Lloyd get into a fight over Jessica, without her knowing it, which causes the duo to angrily break off their friendship. Inevitably, the two make amends when Harry and Lloyd realize that they were nothing without each other. They find Principal Collins' chest in his office which contains evidence of every scam he and Ms. Heller ever pulled, and that evidence could put them away for 20 years.

The next day, Principal Collins finds his evidence chest missing, and Ms. Heller falsely accuses Jessica of taking it. As a result, Principal Collins prank calls her parents and keeps her at his house overnight in an attempt to interrogate her. Meanwhile, the Special Needs class builds a float of George Washington for the Thanksgiving Parade. However, after Lloyd and Harry discover the evidence in the chest, they change the float to look like Principal Collins instead. After the class discovers his evidence, they agree to use him as the float instead. They also plan on having it pulled by the class's special bus. Before bringing out the float, they call the police. During the parade, the superintendent of the school district has a police detective pose as Richard Moffit, so Principal Collins would take the grant. Eventually, the Special Needs class brings out their float and proves Principal Collins and Ms. Heller as thieves by putting their recordings over loudspeakers, therefore exposing their plot. Before Principal Collins and Ms. Heller escape with the money, they are arrested by the police. Jessica is grateful for Harry and Lloyd and regards them as heroes, but just like in the original film, the duo's advances to Jessica are in vain, as it turns out that Jessica had a boyfriend. He commends Harry and Lloyd for exposing Collins' and Heller's plot and rides off with Jessica.

Harry and Lloyd vow never to fight and risk their friendship over a woman, but as they head home, they are approached by Fraida Felcher and her twin sister, Rita in a red Ferrari 308 GTS, who offer to take them to visit a new girls' college. After Harry and Lloyd get into another debate over which girl they want, Lloyd declines the offer to settle the debate, and Fraida and Rita furiously drive off, splattering Harry with mud in the process. Jessica's father accidentally hits Harry with his Mercedes, resulting in Harry getting the windshield and hood covered with mud. Jessica's father recognizes Harry and as he frantically thinks his car is covered in feces, Harry and Lloyd casually walk away.

Cast
 Derek Richardson as Harry Dunne
 Lucas Gregory as young Harry Dunne
 Eric Christian Olsen as Lloyd Christmas
 Colin Ford as young Lloyd Christmas
 Rachel Nichols as Jessica Matthews, Harry and Lloyd's crush.
 Eugene Levy as Principal Collins
 Mimi Rogers as Mrs. Dunne
 Luis Guzman as Ray Christmas, the Janitor and Lloyd's dad.
 Cheri Oteri as Ms. Heller
 Bob Saget as Walter Matthews (Charlie)
 Julia Duffy as Mrs. Matthews
 Elden Henson as Turk “the school bully”
 Shia LaBeouf as Lewis
 William Lee Scott as Carl
 Michelle Krusiec as Cindy "Ching-Chong"
 Josh Braaten as Toby
 Teal Redmann as Terri
 Lin Shaye as Margie Neugeboren
 Julie Costello as Fraida Felcher
 Shawnie Costello as Rita Felcher
 Timothy Stack as doctor
 Brian Posehn as convenience store clerk Big "A"

Production
Much of the film was filmed in Atlanta. Many of the school scenes were filmed at Walton High School in Marietta and at the Atlanta International School in Fulton County. The Farrelly brothers, who co-wrote and directed the original Dumb and Dumber, had no involvement in this film whatsoever, nor did Jim Carrey or Jeff Daniels, who played Lloyd and Harry in the original film. Although Peter Farrelly has never seen the prequel, he went on record as saying that he holds no ill will against the film and wished the filmmakers well on it.

Following the success of South Park, co-creators Trey Parker and Matt Stone were originally slated to write the script for the film, but due to scheduling conflicts, by 2000 they opted out of the project and returned their salary back to New Line Cinema.

Reception

Box office 
In its opening weekend, the film grossed $10.8 million in 2,609 theaters in the United States and Canada. By the end of its run, Dumb and Dumberer: When Harry Met Lloyd grossed $26.3 million domestically and $13 million internationally for a worldwide total of $39.3 million, against a $19 million budget.

Critical response
Dumb and Dumberer: When Harry Met Lloyd was panned by critics. Review aggregation website Rotten Tomatoes gives it a 10% rating based on reviews from 119 critics, with an average score of 2.8/10. The site's critical consensus states: "This lame prequel induces more groans than laughs. Rent the original instead". Metacritic gives the film a score of 19 out of 100, based on reviews from 28 critics, indicating "overwhelming dislike".

Accolades

References

External links

 
 
 
 

2003 films
2000s buddy comedy films
2000s English-language films
2000s screwball comedy films
2000s teen comedy films
American buddy comedy films
American teen comedy films
Dumb and Dumber (franchise)
New Line Cinema films
Films directed by Troy Miller
Films set in 1986
Films set in Rhode Island
Films shot in Georgia (U.S. state)
American slapstick comedy films
American screwball comedy films
2003 comedy films
2000s American films
American prequel films